Richard St John Honner (30 November 1897 – 10 November 1962) was an Australian surgeon, gynaecologist, obstetrician and an Olympic athlete. He competed in the men's 400 metres and the long jump at the 1924 Summer Olympics.

Early life and athletics 
Born in Maitland, South Australia  his family moved when he was a child to Junee, New South Wales.Honner was educated at St Joseph's College, Hunters Hill. While studying medicine at the University of Sydney, Honner trained as a hurdler and long-jumper and was selected for the 1924 Paris Olympics. He finished in overall equal fourteenth place in the long jump and placed third in his heat in the 400m and did not progress. Before he left Australia he set an Australian long jump record which stood for 27 years. While conducting his medical post-graduate qualifications in England, Honner continued to compete in track and field. In 1925 he won the broad jump title at the English National Championship setting a new British record. He defended that title and bettered the British record in 1926.

Medical career
Honner studied medicine at the University of Sydney, graduating in 1922 and taking up a residency at St Vincent's Hospital in 1922-23. Following the 1924 Olympics Honner ventured to the UK for medical residencies (the Middlesex Hospital 1924 and the Poplar and London Hospital 1925-27). He had completed his practitioner and surgery qualifications in England by 1925. In 1928 he was appointed honorary gynaecologist at Lewisham Hospital, and in 1931 surgeon and honorary obstetrician at St Margaret's Hospital. In 1936 he advanced to become a fellow of the Royal College of Surgeons Edinburgh, and in 1937 next year became a fellow of the Royal Australasian College of Surgeons.

War service and personal
During WWII Honner was a major in the Australian Army Medical Corps. He served in military hospitals, in Goulburn and at Alice Springs, Northern Territory. He married  Kathleen Mary Dooley in the chapel of St John's College, University of Sydney in 1928. In 1962 while addressing colleagues at a dinner at the Australia Hotel in Sydney he collapsed and died of a heart attack.

References

External links
 

1897 births
1962 deaths
Athletes (track and field) at the 1924 Summer Olympics
Australian male sprinters
Australian male hurdlers
Australian male long jumpers
Olympic athletes of Australia
People educated at St Joseph's College, Hunters Hill
Sportsmen from New South Wales